Funäsfjällen is an alpine ski area in Sweden.

Funäsfjällen consists of the resorts Funäsdalen, Ramundberget, Tänndalen, Bruksvallarna, Ljusnedal, Messlingen (Mittådalen), Tännäs and Fjällnäs.

Alpine skiing
There are five resorts with alpine skiing: Funäsdalsberget, Ramundberget, Tänndalen (with Tänndalsvallen), Tännäskröket and Kappruet.

Cross-country skiing
Nordic Ski Center, one of the largest cross-country skiing systems in the world (300 km groomed trails, 450 km marked trails), is situated in Funäsfjällen. In Bruksvallarna there are also groomed trails with snowmaking.

References 
The information in this article is based on that in its Swedish equivalent.

External links 
Funäsfjällen

Ski areas and resorts in Sweden